Major General Abbas Kamel (born 1957) is the current Director of the Egyptian General Intelligence Directorate (EGID). He was previously the Chief of Staff to the President Abdel Fattah el-Sisi.

Education 
Abbas Kamel graduated from Military college in 1978, then served as an officer in the armored corps. He received an advanced armament course from the United States of America. He also had strategy courses for military attachés from the Geneva Centre for Security Policy.

Career 
Kamel was the Deputy Egyptian Defense Attaché at the Egyptian embassy in the Czech Republic. He worked in the Military Intelligence and Reconnaissance of the Military Attaché Department until assuming the chairmanship of the branch. 

Kamel became the Director of the Office of the Supreme Commander of the Armed Forces in 2012. In 2014, he served as the Chief of Staff to the President Abdel Fattah el-Sisi, until his appointment as Head of the General Intelligence Service in 2018.

In May 2021, he met Israeli and Palestinian officials following the Israel–Palestine crisis. In August 2021, he met Israeli Prime Minister Naftali Bennett and Defense Minister Benny Gantz to prevent new clashes with Hamas.

Awards 
He was honored with the longest service medal and a second-class Order of the Republic, as well as a medal from the Brazilian State.

References

External links 
 Abbas Kamel, the ubiquitous spy chief consolidating Sisi's power, Intelligence Online, January 20, 2023 (requires free registration)

1957 births
Living people
Egyptian military leaders
Directors of the General Intelligence Directorate (Egypt)